Jeemaralli or Biligere is a small village in Nanjangud taluk of Mysore district in Karnataka state, India.

Location
Jeemaralli is located near Suttur  in Nanjangud taluk.

Demographics
There are 1,334 people in the village according to the latest census. The density of population is 273 persons per km2. There are 315 houses in the village. Literacy rate is 56%.

Geography

Transportation

Temples
 Jeemaralli Devasthana
 Venugopala Devasthana, Billigere 
 Sutturu Mutt, the headquarters of the Lingayath community.

Administration
The village is administered as a part of Suttur panchayath.
Nearest town of the village is T. Narsipur and distance from Jeemaralli village to T. Narsipur is 12 km.

Post Office
The village has a postal service from Nagarle post office and the pin code is 571129.

Biligere village
Biligere village is part of Jeemaralli. There is a primary school and a hospital in Biligere. Most of the people in this village are farmers belonging to five different Hindu castes. There is an ancient temple in Biligere which is demolished for reconstruction purpose. The government of Karnataka has sanctioned Rs.23 lakhs for the work.

Literacy
The village has a lower literacy rate compared to other parts of Karnataka. In 2011, the literacy was 55%.

See also
 Sutturu
 Nagarle
Alambur
 Kahalli

Image gallery

References

Villages in Mysore district